Omar Beltre (Born August 24, 1981) is a Dominican former professional baseball pitcher. He played in Major League Baseball (MLB) for the Texas Rangers.

Professional career

Minor leagues
Beltre signed with the Texas Rangers on March 1, 2000. He received a $600,000 bonus, the largest the Rangers have ever given an international player. He was assigned to the Gulf Coast League Rangers, and went 5–4 with a 3.54 earned run average and 44 strikeouts in his first professional season. He improved to 6–3 with a 3.38 ERA and 83 strikeouts for the Appalachian League's Pulaski Rangers in 2001, leading his team in both wins and strikeouts.

After sitting out the entire 2002 season with an injury, he returned to go 3–3 with a 2.39 ERA for the Midwest League's Clinton LumberKings in 2003. Having been used primarily as a starter up to that point, Beltre only made five starts in 2003, and made eleven appearances out of the bullpen.

Human trafficking ring
After going 5–5 with a 2.45 ERA and 47 strikeouts in 46 games (all in relief) with the Stockton Ports in 2004, Beltre earned his first invitation to spring training. When he went to the U.S. embassy in January 2005 to pick up his work visa, consulate officials were waiting. According to the Rangers' information, consulate officials soon discovered an inordinate number of young minor league ballplayers had been married in a short period of time to women who had previously been denied visas, and it raised a red flag.

Beltre immediately admitted guilt to his involvement in a human trafficking ring, and was assured that he would likely only receive a one-year exclusion, and that he would be able to reapply the following year. As it turned out, he was banned from entering the United States for five years, limiting him to winter ball, the Dominican Summer League and international tournaments.

He missed all of the 2008 season and most of 2009 with another injury.

Texas Rangers
On February 12, 2010, he and pitcher Alexi Ogando, who was also involved in the human trafficking ring out of the Dominican Republic, were granted visas, and allowed to attend Spring training, arriving in the U.S. on the 16th. After spring training, he was assigned to the triple A Oklahoma City RedHawks of the Pacific Coast League, where he went 0–5 with a 2.39 ERA in fifteen games (five starts) before getting called up to the majors.

He was optioned to the Triple A Oklahoma City RedHawks on July 6, 2010, and never made another major league appearance.

Beltré underwent surgery for spinal stenosis in February 2011. He became a free agent at the end of the season.

References

External links

Minor League Baseball

1981 births
Living people
Baseball players at the 2007 Pan American Games
Clinton LumberKings players
Dominican Republic criminals
Dominican Republic expatriate baseball players in the United States
Gulf Coast Rangers players
Major League Baseball pitchers
Major League Baseball players from the Dominican Republic
Oklahoma City RedHawks players
Pulaski Rangers players
Texas Rangers players
Toros del Este players
Sportspeople from Santo Domingo
Stockton Ports players
Sportspeople convicted of crimes
Pan American Games competitors for the Dominican Republic
Arizona League Rangers players
Azucareros del Este players
Dominican Summer League Rangers players